Turner & Hooch is an American buddy cop action-comedy television series based on, and a continuation of, the 1989 film of the same name. The series, created and written by executive producer Matt Nix, serves as a legacy sequel and is produced in association with Flying Glass of Milk Productions, Wonderland Sound and Vision and 20th Television, starring Josh Peck, Lyndsy Fonseca, Carra Patterson, and Vanessa Lengies. It is the third overall installment in the eponymous franchise and premiered on July 21, 2021 as a Disney+ exclusive. The series was canceled after one season.

Premise
U.S. Marshal Scott Turner inherits an unruly dog named Hooch, who may become the partner he needs. Together, the partnership, alongside the rest of the Turner family, discover that Turner's father's death may not have been accidental.

Cast

Main 

 Josh Peck as Scott Turner Jr., a buttoned-down and ambitious U.S. Marshal, the son of the late Det. Scott Turner, who ends up inheriting an unruly dog.
 Carra Patterson as Jessica Baxter, Scott's partner, whose personality is a "sharp contrast to his spit-and-polish ways", and who has a brave and quick-thinking personality while working, through whose sense of humor often leads her into trouble. As of "In The Line of Fur", she's placed on desk duty due to her pregnancy.
 Lyndsy Fonseca as Laura Turner, Scott's sister and a veterinary assistant, who brings Hooch to Scott while coming to terms with their father's death, as she ropes Scott into investigating it.
 Vanessa Lengies as Erica Mouniere, a dog lover and trainer at the U.S. Marshal K-9 facility with a crush on Turner, who agrees to train Hooch.
 Brandon Jay McLaren as Xavier "X" Wilson, a marine-turned-US Marshal, who develops a soft spot for Hooch in spite of being a cat lover. One of the office's most experienced members, he is described as "cool and enigmatic and a bit quirky".
 Jeremy Maguire as Matthew Garland, a dog lover and Scott's nephew, who becomes thrilled when Scott inherits Hooch.
 Anthony Ruivivar as James Mendez, a US Marshal Chief and Scott's boss, who respects Scott but initially is uncomfortable with Hooch, only to give him authorization to receive K-9 training after he helps solve a case.

Special guest stars
 Sheila Kelley as Dr. Emily Turner, Scott's mother and veterinarian. She was previously portrayed by Mare Winningham in the original film and Wendee Pratt in the 1990 pilot.
 Reginald VelJohnson as David Sutton, a former police detective partner of the late Scott Turner Sr. and now mayor of Cypress Beach. VelJohnson is the only actor from the original film to appear in the series.

Recurring
 Matt Hamilton as Trent Havelock, Senior Deputy Marshal to Scott Turner and doesn't much like dogs. He gets all the fame, all the glory, and all the great cases — everything Scott thinks he wants.
 Becca Tobin as Brooke Mailer, Scott's girlfriend and a prosecutor who downplays her status as part of a wealthy family of powerful lawyers. She is described as representing "everything Scott thinks he wants out of life".
 Paul Campbell as Grady Garland, Laura Turner's ex-husband and Matthew's father. He's a well-meaning small-town cop who peaked in high school and at this point probably has more in common with his 8-year-old than his ex.
 Cristina Rosato as Olivia, Xavier Wilson's fiancée and an Oakland cop from the Midwest. She's warm, earnest and enthusiastic — seemingly the complete opposite of her enigmatic soon-to-be husband.

Episodes

Production

Development 
In 1990, Touchstone Television developed a TV pilot based on the Touchstone Pictures film Turner & Hooch, with Thomas F. Wilson starring as Scott Turner and Beasley the Dog reprising his role from the film as Hooch. The pilot was not green-lit for a series order, and was ultimately aired as part of The Magical World of Disney in July 1990. A television series reboot developed by Matt Nix was announced to be in development for the Disney+ streaming service in December 2019, officially receiving a 12-episode order in February 2020; Josh Peck was cast as Scott Turner. That same month, Lyndsy Fonseca and Carra Patterson joined the cast, while Josh Levy was revealed to be co-executive-producing the series. On March 6, Vanessa Lengies joined the cast. In January 2021, it announced that McG would direct the pilot and also serve as executive producer. On December 2, 2021, Disney+ canceled the series after one season.

Casting 
On September 22, 2020, the day filming began, Anthony Ruivivar, Brandon Jay McLaren, and Jeremy Maguire joined the cast in lead roles, while Becca Tobin joined in the recurring role. In January 2021, Paul Campbell was cast in the recurring role.

Filming 
Filming for Turner & Hooch was originally scheduled to begin on April 27, 2020, taking place in Vancouver, British Columbia, Canada. Fonseca filmed the series concurrently with Fox's 9-1-1: Lone Star. Filming was delayed and began on September 22, 2020, and was scheduled to conclude on April 19, 2021.

Marketing 
A trailer for the series was released on June 23, 2021.

Release 
Turner & Hooch was initially announced to be released on July 16, 2021, on Disney+, and would release its 12 episodes weekly until October 1. However, on June 16, 2021, it was announced that after the success of the Wednesday release of Loki, Disney+ would be moving most of its original premieres to Wednesdays. As a result, Turner & Hooch was released on July 21, 2021. The Red Carpet Premiere took place in Los Angeles on July 17, 2021.

Reception

Critical reception 
On Rotten Tomatoes, the series holds an approval rating of 57% based on 21 critic reviews, with an average rating of 5.8/10. The website's critical consensus reads, "Likeable, but slight, Turner & Hooch features a mighty fine pooch, but those looking for more narrative meat may want to try a different bone." On Metacritic, the film has a weighted average score of 49 out of 100, based on 7 critics, indicating "mixed or average reviews".

Matt Fowler of IGN gave the show 6 out of 10 and stated, "Nothing feels dumbed down or muted, though the dog dilemma involving Hooch being thrust upon an unwilling owner feels like a questionable situation now instead of a light-hearted romp." Lucy Mangan of The Guardian rated the series 3 out of 5 stars, writing, "Josh Peck and his law-enforcing hound do their best to follow in the pawsteps of the Tom Hanks original, but this remake is all bark and no bite." Ashley Moulton of Common Sense Media gave the show 3 out of 5 and an '11+' age rating, stating, "Dog-loving teens may enjoy this show, which is relatively tame in most aspects besides the violence, but many will roll their eyes at the cheesy dialogue and storylines."

Joel Keller of Decider gave the series a mixed review and wrote: "We’re recommending Turner & Hooch mostly for the dog. He’s not quite as slobbery as the original Hooch, but he’s definitely slobbery enough to contrast with the fastidious Scott Turner. Without Hooch, the show is mostly a generic basic-cable mystery series; if it can’t develop better relationships between its characters, the dog will still be the only thing keeping us watching." Daniel Fienberg of The Hollywood Reporter gave the show a negative review and stated, "I'm not even complaining when I call Turner & Hooch a forgettable, one-joke series. It's hard to know what else it could have been." Brian Lowry of CNN gave the show a negative review and stated, "Even if Hooch sits at attention like a good dog, after a few episodes of Turner & Hooch, it's hard to share that patience or loyalty." Alan Sepinwall of Rolling Stone gave the show 2.5 out of 5 and stated, "It leans much too hard into the corny aesthetic of those kinds of lighthearted dramas, creating something too silly and childish for most adults, yet likely too old-fashioned for their own children."

Accolades 
Jon Kralt was nominated for a 2022 Leo Award in the category Best Stunt Performance in a Dramatic Series for work in this series.

References

External links 
 
 

2020s American police comedy television series
2021 American television series debuts
2021 American television series endings
Disney+ original programming
English-language television shows
Live action television shows based on films
Television series by 20th Century Fox Television
Television series by Wonderland Sound and Vision
Television shows about dogs
Television shows filmed in Vancouver
Television shows set in San Francisco
Turner & Hooch (franchise)
United States Marshals Service in fiction